Groove Records was a subsidiary of RCA Victor records, founded by Billboard writer Bob Rolontz in 1953 as a rhythm and blues label. The label tried hard to break into the R&B market. Piano Red had its first hit but Mickey & Sylvia was its first big seller. The label also recorded  King Curtis, Arthur Crudup, Brook Benton and George Benson.  Following Mickey & Sylvia's big hit "Love Is Strange" in 1957, Groove was deactivated and its remaining artists switched over to RCA's Vik subsidiary.

In 1961, Groove was revived as a budget singles label with more of a country music bent, and some pop and R&B acts.  It was given a full revival in 1963. Artists who recorded for the later incarnation of Groove included Sonny James, Justin Tubb, Marty Paich, Johnny Nash, Jack Scott, Johnnie Ray, Skip Battin, and Charlie Rich.  This version of the label lasted until 1965.

See also
 List of record labels

References

American record labels
RCA Records
Record labels established in 1953
Rhythm and blues record labels